CNN Philippines Sports Desk (formerly Solar SportsDesk, or simply Sports Desk) is a Philippine sports news television program broadcast by CNN Philippines. It is CNN Philippines' go-to program for all-sports news, specials, and interviews with sports personalities here and around the world, hosted by sports journalist Charles Tiu on primetime and Andrei Felix on weekday mornings (also a sports anchor on CNN Philippines New Day and the morning edition of Newsroom). Sports Desk airs on weekdays at 10am (with a replay at 2:30pm) and 10pm, with a weekend recap edition on Saturdays at 12:30pm.

History
Sports Desk was first broadcast on cable TV channel Solar Sports from 2004 to 2007 and returned on Solar News Channel by December 3, 2012, with a simulcast on Solar Sports until August 2014 following SNC's rebrand as 9TV.

As part of the expansion, Sports Desk also serves as a sports segment on some CNN Philippines newscasts. However, when major rolling news stories break across their timeslots, the Sports Desk program would either interrupt or pre-empt its normal broadcast. For instance, should the morning edition be pre-empted by a rolling coverage, a replacement live broadcast will take place at the 2:30 pm rerun timeslot.

On September 3, 2017, the primetime edition of Sports Desk was moved to an earlier timeslot at 6:30pm, after News Night divides its full hour single newscast into two 30-minute editions. Three months later, on December 16, Halili stepped down from his anchor role as he left the CNN franchise. The program's basketball analyst Charles Tiu, brother of PBA veteran Chris Tiu, was named as an interim host for the early evening and late night editions.

The 6:30pm edition of SportsDesk aired its final episode on December 29, 2017, to give way to the full-time relaunch of Amanpour. The cancellation was part of the network's reorganization. The remaining two editions remain intact.

In March 2020, Sports Desk halted its productions due to the Enhanced community quarantine in Luzon caused by the COVID-19 pandemic, but the news segment on various newscasts continued to air.

In 2021, after a year of absence, Sports Desk returned on the air albeit on a weekday morning basis.

Anchors

Current
 Andrei Felix

Former
Jinno Rufino (currently a main presenter of The Game on One Sports)
Cesca Litton (currently moved to One Sports)
Mico Halili (moved as digital head of ABS-CBN Sports (2017-2020), currently as Creative Director for Sports Programmes on Cignal TV)
 Charles Tiu  – Basketball Analyst

Correspondent

Current
Pauline Verzosa

Former
Paolo Del Rosario 
Paola Palma
Paul Garcia

Awards

KBP Golden Dove Awards (Kapisanan ng mga Brodkaster ng Pilipinas)
2017 – Best Sports Program – Sports Desk @ 11am

See also
 List of programs broadcast by CNN Philippines

References

2004 Philippine television series debuts
2007 Philippine television series endings
2012 Philippine television series debuts
2020s Philippine television series
CNN Philippines original programming
CNN Philippines News and Current Affairs
English-language television shows
Philippine sports television series
Solar Entertainment Corporation
Television productions suspended due to the COVID-19 pandemic